The 12th Arizona State Legislature, consisting of the Arizona State Senate and the Arizona House of Representatives, was constituted from January 1, 1935, to December 31, 1936, during Benjamin Baker Moeur's second term as Governor of Arizona, in Phoenix. The number of senators remained constant, while the number of representatives in the house decreased from 63 to 51. The Republicans broke the Democrats complete domination in the senate, managing to obtain a single seat, that of Apache County, however the house was entirely in Democratic hands.

Sessions
The Legislature met for the Non regular session at the State Capitol in Phoenix on January 14, 1935; and adjourned on March 21. There was a special session which ran from November 5–24, 1936.

State Senate

Members

The asterisk (*) denotes members of the previous Legislature who continued in office as members of this Legislature.

Employees
The following held unelected positions within the Legislature:

 Secretary: William J. Graham
 Sergeant-at-Arms: Frank J. Gillick
 Chaplain: Reverend T. T. Hughes
 Chaplain: Reverend Perry McArthur

House of Representatives

Members
The asterisk (*) denotes members of the previous Legislature who continued in office as members of this Legislature. The House shrank by twelve seats from the 11th Legislature: 4 in Maricopa County, 2 each in Cochise and Gila counties, and 1 each in Greenlee, Pima, Yavapai and Yuma counties.

Employees
The following held unelected positions within the Legislature:

 Chief Clerk: Lallah Ruth
 Assistant Chief Clerk: Ruby Coulter
 Sergeant-at-Arms: Henry Hilbers
 Chaplain: Reverend Cecil Harris

References

Arizona legislative sessions
1935 in Arizona
1936 in Arizona
1935 U.S. legislative sessions
1936 U.S. legislative sessions